Dryinus sinicus is a species of dryinidae wasp. It is a parasitoid of the nymph stage spotted lanternfly in its native range of China.

References

Dryinidae
Insects of China
Insects described in 1987